= St. Moritz Olympics =

St. Moritz has been the host to two Winter Olympic Games:

- 1928 Winter Olympics
- 1948 Winter Olympics
